Dorcadion granigerum is a species of beetle in the family Cerambycidae. It was described by Ludwig Ganglbauer in 1883. It is known from Greece.

See also 
Dorcadion

References

granigerum
Beetles described in 1883